The Blues EP is the second recording by Some Girls.

Track listing

Some Girls (California band) albums
2003 EPs
Deathwish Inc. EPs